Aled is a male Welsh given name and may refer to:

Aled Brew, Welsh rugby union player
Aled Davies, Welsh rugby union player
Aled Edwards, Canadian structural biologist
Aled Haydn Jones (born 1976), Welsh radio producer
Aled James, rugby league player
Aled Jones (born 1970), Welsh singer and broadcaster
Aled Owen Roberts (1889–1949), Welsh politician, soldier and businessman
Aled Thomas, Welsh rugby union player
Aled Wyn Davies (born 1974), classical tenor from Wales
Tudur Aled (1465–1525), late medieval Welsh poet

See also 

Åled, an urban area in Sweden

Welsh masculine given names